Thom Donovan (born Thomas Joseph Donovan; July 24, 1974 in St. Louis, Missouri) is an American guitarist, singer, songwriter and producer. He has released five solo albums and was the lead vocalist and guitarist of the band Lapush. His international performance career has included concerts across the United States as well as cities around the world. Donovan has performed with Brandi Carlile, Ruby Amanfu, Will Hoge, and worked with Wyclef Jean of The Fugees on his single, Shipwreck. Donovan's music frequently appears in film and television. He had a recurring role in the ABC musical drama series, Nashville, as a musician.

Childhood and early life
Of Irish and Italian descent, Donovan, the middle of three children, was born in St. Louis, MO. His father's record collection inspired him to begin writing songs at a young age. Thom Donovan was educated at Lindenwood University where he graduated with a BA in Music, studying under John McClellan (Luciano Pavarotti). At Lindenwood, Donovan performed in a master class with Scott Tennant of the Los Angeles Guitar Quartet.

Career

Early work (1995–2000)

While in college, Thom Donovan formed a duo with his brother, Stephen Donovan, called Elevator to a Penthouse. The duo's primary influences were Velvet Underground and the sounds of Motown; which the brothers had discovered in their father's record collection. An album, bigelectricheart, was recorded on 8-track, half-inch tape.

STIR and Lapush (2001–2008)

In 2001, Donovan formed Lapush with his brother, Stephen. Singing and playing guitar and working as the band's primary songwriter and producer, Lapush marked the first time Donovan would front a band on his own. However, Lapush would have to wait, as later in 2001, Donovan briefly joined the band Stir in the studio during the recording of their 3rd album (which was never officially released). He then agreed to tour the album once it was released and played a few St. Louis area gigs with the band from 2002 through 2003. However, the band was dropped from their label, Capitol Records, and then went on hiatus, allowing Donovan to concentrate on his own project.

In 2004, Lapush signed to 456 Entertainment (Fontana/Universal) and released their debut album, Someplace Closer to Here, in June 2005. Later that same year the band would make their television debut performing on Last Call with Carson Daly on NBC. The album featured the singles, "Aurora", "Quit You Now" and "Say Something". Songs from the album were featured frequently in film and television, including Moonlight on CBS as well as Laguna Beach and The Hills on MTV.

The band's second album, Modern Blues was released in 2007 and featured the singles, "Closer", "Run" and "Leave The Light On". Modern Blues was dedicated to the memory of Donovan's father who died in 2006 from pancreatic cancer. Donovan penned the song "Closer" for his father. Songs from this record were featured on several television shows. Lapush also performed with Nikka Costa, Matt Nathanson, The Sounds and Hot Hot Heat. Donovan produced and mixed both Lapush albums in his home studio, The Control Tower.

Lapush officially broke up in June 2008.

Solo career/Nashville (2008–present)

"I Love How You Love Me" was the first solo single released by Donovan in 2008. Donovan's first solo performance was on July 26, 2008 in St. Louis, MO opening for OneRepublic.

Cast A Light, Donovan's debut solo album was released on March 30, 2010 through his own imprint, Lapush Recordings. "September Glows", the final track from Cast A Light has been featured on KROQ-FM in Los Angeles and has also been featured on MTV. Songs from Cast A Light have appeared in television shows on MTV, and VH-1. Donovan celebrated the release of his first solo album with two performances at SXSW in Austin, TX on March 17, 2010.

Donovan moved from St. Louis to Nashville in 2010 after signing a publishing contract with Nettwerk and Revelry Music Group. He signed a new publishing contract with Kobalt in 2012. Donovan's solo albums are release via AWAL, a London-based distributor owned by Kobalt.

Mercury Maybe, was released on March 27, 2012. The first single, "Drive", was re-recorded and taken from the original Elevator to a Penthouse sessions. Donovan collaborated with Ken Harrison and Roberta Carter-Harrison from Wild Strawberries on Mercury Maybe. Donovan and Harrison co-wrote "Division Street", "Liza", and "Still All Right". Roberta Carter-Harrison sang on "Drive" and "Still All Right". The trio would eventually collaborate on an electronic project called Sealt in 2013, releasing an EP.

Donovan released his third solo album, Canon, on June 17, 2014. Donovan collaborated with Wyclef Jean and Ruby Amanfu on the album's first single, "Shipwreck". The video for "Shipwreck" was directed by Anthony Matula and features members of the Nashville Ballet. Donovan composed the lyrics for "Shipwreck"—inspired by Arthur Brooke and his poem, The Tragicall History of Romeus and Juliet (1562). The album was mixed by Grammy award-winning engineer, Vance Powell.

Donovan released this fourth album, Sea of Stories, on July 6, 2018. Sea of Stories is an electronic album featuring the single, "So Cruel", "Ship Is Coming In" and "How's It Gonna Be?".

Timekeeper was released on June 18, 2021. On Donovan's fifth studio album, the sound was focused primarily on acoustic guitar. The album was inspired by a music festival he played in November 2019 in the Dominican Republic with John Prine.

Rossi (2012–2013)

In January 2012 Donovan formed Rossi with Kendall Morgan. Prior to launching Rossi, the two co-wrote a song called "Overload," which Morgan released as solo material and was featured on CBS's The Good Wife. The group's first two singles, "Ossetia" and "War Within", were featured on My Old Kentucky Blog's radio show on Sirius Satellite Radio. Rossi's debut show was March 2, 2012 at The Basement in Nashville opening for Mona. "War Within" has been featured on Simon Raymonde's radio show on Amazing Radio in the UK.

On March 5, 2013, Rossi's third single, "Your God", appeared in an episode of Body of Proof on ABC.

Will Hoge (2016–Present)

Donovan was tapped by Will Hoge to play guitar on his studio album 'Anchors'. Donovan officially joined the band in late 2016. Hoge and Donovan originally spoke of Donovan joining Hoge's band around 2007, but Donovan's schedule did not allow for him to join at the time.

Television appearances

Donovan had a small role in the ABC musical drama series, Nashville, as the keyboardist in Avery Barkley's band. The show was written by Academy Award winner Callie Khouri. The series was picked up by ABC on May 11, 2012. Donovan appeared in 8 episodes in Season 1. During Season 2, he performed with Deacon Claybourne and Scarlett O'Connor. He returned for Seasons 3 and 4 as a guitarist for The Exes. Donovan has appeared in all 6 seasons of the show.

Musical equipment and sound
Donovan has been credited with a unique sound and approach to the guitar. Rick Anderson, Allmusic comments: "Tout Le Monde" features what is probably the best six-note guitar solo ever recorded." Donovan cites a combination of traditional, classical and electronic music as sources for inspiration. In an interview with Amplifier Magazine, Donovan states: "The idea is to blend two things that have no business with each other. I enjoy composing on the computer as much as writing with an acoustic instrument. I want to take sounds from the past and push them into the future."

Influences

Donovan's earliest influence was the sound of Motown; which he discovered in his father's record collection. Other notable influences include: Nick Drake, John Frusciante, The Smiths, and Oasis. Donovan studied classical guitar and cites Baden Powell as an influence.

Film and television
Donovan's music appears regularly in film and television including: Body of Proof on ABC, The Good Wife on CBS, Moonlight on CBS, The Hills on MTV, The City on MTV, and Laguna Beach: The Real Orange County on MTV.

Discography (Will Hoge)

Albums

 (2022) Wings on my Shoes ·  Americana Top 10 (#7) single ("John Prine's Cadillac"),  Americana Top 10 (#4) album.
 (2020) Tiny Little Movies 
 (2018) My American Dream 
 (2017) Anchors · Billboard US Heatseekers Top 10 (#6) | Billboard US Indie Top 20 (#14) |  Americana Top 10 (#6) album.

Discography (Solo career)

Albums & EPs

 (2021) Timekeeper 
 (2021) Division Street - EP 
 (2018) Sea of Stories 
 (2014) Canon 
 (2012) Mercury Maybe
 (2010) Cast a Light

Discography (Lapush)

Albums & EPs

 (2007) Modern Blues 
 (2005) Someplace Closer to Here
 (2003) an EP by Lapush

Collaborations

 (2017–current) Guitarist for Will Hoge.
 (2013–2014, 2019–current) Guitarist for Ruby Amanfu.
 (2016) Buffalo by Shelly Fairchild. (Credits: co-writer "Lies").
 (2016) Guitarist for Shelly Fairchild.
 (2013) Love Out Loud single by Ruby Amanfu. (Credits: co-producer).
 (2013) 1 EP by Sealt. (Credits: producer, co-writer).
 (2013) Your God single by Rossi. (Credits: producer, co-writer).
 (2012) War Within single by Rossi. (Credits: producer, co-writer).
 (2012) Ossetia single by Rossi. (Credits: producer, co-writer).
 (2012) Through Frozen Forests EP  by Aaron Espe. (Credits: co-writer on "Turn") * Peak Chart Position: #5 iTunes UK singer/songwriter.
 (2012) Three by Aaron Espe. (Credits: mastering).
 (2011) Overload single by Kendall Morgan. (Credits: producer, co-writer).
 (2011) First Days Of Summer single (alternate version) by Carter's Chord. (Credits: producer).
 (2011) Again single (alternate version) by Carter's Chord. (Credits: producer).
 (2003) Untitled, Unmastered, and Unemployed by Stir. (Credits: co-writer, guitar). Recorded for Capitol Records.
 (2002–2003) Guitarist for Stir.
 (2001) nevertheless EP by Flynova. (Credits: guitar, writer on "You're Still Pretending").
 (1999–2000) Guitarist for British rock band, Fono. World tour with Goo Goo Dolls and Robert Plant.
 (1996–1998) bigelectricheart 8-track demos by Elevator to a Penthouse. (Credits: co-producer, co-writer).

Television Appearances
Nashville on CMT Season 6, 6 episodes (2017–2018)
Episodes 606, 607, 608, 609, 610, 615

Nashville on CMT Season 5, 4 episodes (2016–2017)
Episodes 504, 505, 513, 517

Nashville on ABC Season 4, 6 episodes (2015–2016)
Episodes 408, 412, 414, 415, 418, 421
Role: guitar for The Xs (Gunnar Scott, Scarlett O'Connor)

Nashville on ABC Season 3, 4 episodes (2014–2015)
Episodes 315, 316, 317, 318
Role: guitar & keyboards for Triple Xs (Gunnar Scott, Scarlett O'Connor, Avery Barkley)

Nashville on ABC Season 2, 3 episodes (2013–2014)
Episodes 201, 206, 207
Role: guitar & keyboards for Deacon Claybourne, Avery Barkley, Scarlett O'Connor

Nashville on ABC Season 1, 8 episodes (2012–2013)
Episodes 102, 106, 107, 108, 109, 111, 112, 121
Role: keyboards for Avery Barkley

Last Call with Carson Daly on NBC (2005)
Performed 2 songs with Lapush

References

External links
 Official Thom Donovan Website
 Thom Donovan on Twitter
 Thom Donovan — Nettwerk Composer
 Thom Donovan — Composer Revelry Music Group Nashville, TN
 Official Lapush Website
 Lapush at MySpace
 Lapush at MTV.com

Living people
Songwriters from Missouri
Lindenwood University alumni
Guitarists from Missouri
1974 births
Musicians from St. Louis
21st-century American guitarists